The fire grid burnet (Arniocera erythropyga) is a day-flying moth of the family Zygaenidae found in Zimbabwe and Malawi to Mozambique and South Africa.

This moth looks different from other burnets, mainly because of its colours. The common name of this moth refers to its fore wing pattern of black-edged, red bands on a metallic blue-green ground colour. The hind wing is pinkish red with a broad, marginal band of black. Males have hairs covering their head.

References 
David Carter. Eyewitness Handbooks on Butterflies and Moths 1995.
  Retrieved April 20, 2018.

Zygaenidae
Lepidoptera of Malawi
Lepidoptera of Mozambique
Lepidoptera of South Africa
Lepidoptera of Zimbabwe
Moths of Sub-Saharan Africa
Moths described in 1860

cs:Vřetenuška tužebníková
da:Seksplettet køllesværmer
de:Sechsfleck-Widderchen
fr:Zygène de la spirée
lt:Vingiorykštinis marguolis
nl:Sint-Jansvlinder
sk:Vretienka obyčajná